Franklin High School (formally Benjamin Franklin High School) is a public high school in Portland, Oregon, United States. It is located in central southeast Portland in the South Tabor neighborhood.

History
Founded in 1914, Franklin is Portland's fourth high school. The city's high schools were filled to capacity at the time, and the population in southeast Portland was rapidly growing. It was initially founded in part of the Creston elementary school, with nine instructors and 115 student in the spring 1914 semester. The current brick building, designed by Floyd Naramore, opened in September 1917.

In 1942, a statue of Benjamin Franklin, after whom the school was named, was installed outside of Franklin High School.

Due to the baby boom and the passing of a $25 million building levy by the school district in 1947, a new addition for arts, industrial arts, and home economics departments was slated.

In October 2010 the school decided to discontinue its competitive robotics team due to the lack of any school official sanctioning the team, allegedly by locking the team out of their workspace without access to their tools, or the more than $7000 the team had raised to sustain the program.  The team had been a part of the school for seven years.

Between 2015 and 2017, the school was modernized and expanded, with funding from a $482 million bond measure in 2012. The modernization included a new arts center, a new gym, biomedical, and culinary arts building, seismic retrofitting, and a new entrance.

Student profile
In the 2017–2018 school year, Franklin's student population was 48.9% White, 20.5% Hispanic, 16.4% Asian, 5.6% African American, 0.6% Pacific Islander, 0.6% Native American, and 7.4% mixed race.

In 2008, 80% of the school's seniors received a high school diploma. Of 354 students, 282 graduated, 52 dropped out, five received a modified diploma, and 15 were still in high school the following year. In 2009, 31% of the students were transfers into the school.

Notable alumni 

 Robin Reed, US Olympic Gold Medalist wrestling 1924
 Bob Amsberry, actor on The Mickey Mouse Club
 Douglas Engelbart, inventor of the computer mouse
 Tamara Fazzolari, Miss Oregon 1987
 Vic Gilliam, Oregon State Representative from the 18th District
 Chris Gorsek, Oregon State Representative from the 49th District
 Howard Hobson, head men's basketball coach at the University of Oregon (1936–47); led the team to the first NCAA Men's Division I Basketball Championship in 1939
 Steve "Snapper" Jones, former basketball player in the ABA and NBA; color analyst for Portland Trail Blazers broadcasts
 Jack Landau, Oregon Supreme Court Justice
 Gerald Mahan, physicist and member of the National Academy of Sciences
 Rod Monroe, Oregon State Senator from the 24th District
 Legedu Naanee, former NFL player
 Claire Phillips, spy in the Japanese-occupied Philippines during World War II; recipient of the Medal of Freedom
 Johnnie Ray, singer
 Shoni Schimmel, WNBA player with the Atlanta Dream
 Richard Unis, Oregon Supreme Court Justice
 Denorval Unthank, Jr., architect and University of Oregon Faculty member

References

External links
 

1914 establishments in Oregon
Educational institutions established in 1914
High schools in Portland, Oregon
Portland Public Schools (Oregon)
Public high schools in Oregon
South Tabor, Portland, Oregon